Lake Goodwin is a lake in Snohomish County, Washington, United States. The surrounding census district of Lake Goodwin, Washington is named after the lake.

The lake is the largest and by far the most popular of the Seven Lakes area northwest of Marysville, Washington. Wenberg County Park is the main public access to the lake.  In 1996, Snohomish County bought a formerly privately owned resort on the north tip of the lake, and is working on developing it into a park.

References

Lakes of Snohomish County, Washington
Lakes of Washington (state)